Unpredictable is an album by the American singer Natalie Cole. Released on February 22, 1977, by Capitol Records, the album includes the single "I've Got Love on My Mind", which peaked at No. 5 on the U.S. Billboard Hot 100 and topped the R&B chart.

Track listing

Personnel
 Natalie Cole – lead vocals
 Tennyson Stephens, Marvin Yancy – keyboards
 Terry Fryer – synthesizer
 Criss Johnson – guitar
 Phil Upchurch – acoustic guitar
 Larry Ball – bass guitar
 Donnell Hagan – drums
 Derf Reklaw – percussion
 The Colettes – backing vocals
 The N Sisters – backing vocals
 Gene Barge – rhythm arrangements (1-5, 7, 8, 10)
 Richard Evans – horn and string arrangements, rhythm arrangements (6, 9)

Production
 Producers – Chuck Jackson and Marvin Yancy
 Co-Producer on Track 3 – Gene Barge
 Executive Producer – Larkin Arnold
 Engineers – Paul Serrano and Steve Hodge
 Remixed at Westlake Audio (Los Angeles, CA).
 Mastered by Wally Traugott at Capitol Studios (Hollywood, CA).
 Art Direction – Roy Kohara
 Photography – Raul Vega
 Management – Kevin Hunter at New Direction (Los Angeles, CA).
 Janice Williams - spiritual adviser

Charts

Weekly charts

Year-end charts

Singles

Certifications

See also
List of number-one R&B albums of 1977 (U.S.)

References

External links
 Unpredictable at Discogs

1977 albums
Natalie Cole albums
Capitol Records albums